This page, one list of hereditary baronies, lists all baronies, extant, extinct, dormant, abeyant, or forfeit, in the Peerage of England.



Baronies, 1264–1707

1264–1300

1301–1400

1401–1500

1501–1600

1601–1700

1701–1707

See also
List of Lordships of Parliament (for Scotland)
List of baronies in the Peerage of Ireland
List of baronies in the Peerage of Great Britain
List of hereditary baronies in the Peerage of the United Kingdom

Footnotes

Notes

References

England
Lists of British nobility